Arian Çuliqi is an Albanian television director and TV script writer who has produced films based for Albanian television since 1993.

Çuliqi directed and wrote the script for his first film in 1993 Dashi pa brirë. This followed by Pak freskët sonte in 1994 and Gjithë fajet i ka paraja and Fundi i marrëzisë in 1995. Other films include Dashuri me krizma which he directed and wrote for national Albanian TV in 1997.

He has directed films such as the drama film Borxhliu in 1999.
Other films: "Një baba tepër" (1999); "Pas një lajmi" (2000); "Pesha e gruas sime" (2001); soap opera "Piruet" (2005-2006)

External links

Albanian film directors
Albanian television directors
Living people
Year of birth missing (living people)